Eriochilus dilatatus, commonly known as the white bunny orchid, is a plant in the orchid family Orchidaceae and is endemic to Western Australia. It is a common and widespread, slender ground orchid with a single leaf and up to fifteen small white and greenish flowers with reddish or brownish markings and a hairy labellum.

Description
Eriochilus dilatatus is a terrestrial,  perennial, deciduous, herb with an underground tuber. Flowering occurs between March and June with some subspecies flowering more prolifically after fire.

Taxonomy, naming and distribution
Eriochilus dilatatus was first formally described in 1840 by John Lindley and the description was published in A Sketch of the Vegetation of the Swan River Colony. The specific epithet (dilatatus) is a Latin word meaning "spread out", "enlarge", or "extend", referring to the broad labellum and lateral sepals.

There are six subspecies:
 E. dilatatus subsp. dilatatus which grows in shrubland and woodland in near-coastal areas between Dirk Hartog Island and Israelite Bay;
 E. dilatatus subsp. brevifolius which grows in shrubland between Cataby and the Murchison River;
 E. dilatatus subsp. magnus which grows in high rainfall areas between Perth and Albany;
 E. dilatatus subsp. multiflorus found in woodland and forest between Jurien Bay and Albany;
 E. dilatatus subsp. orientalis which is only found near Caiguna;
 E. dilatatus subsp. undulatus which is the most widespread subspecies and grows in a range of habitats between Mullewa and Esperance.

Ecology
All bunny orchids are pollinated by small native bees, attracted to nectar at the base of the labellum.

Use in horticulture
Eriochilus species are generally easily grown in pots in a bushhouse or cool glasshouse. They need to be watered regularly when growing but kept dry when dormant during summer.

References 

dilatatus
Plants described in 1840
Endemic orchids of Australia
Orchids of Australia
Orchids of Western Australia
Endemic flora of Western Australia